Dibenzylideneacetone or dibenzalacetone, often abbreviated dba, is an organic compound with the formula C17H14O. It is a pale-yellow solid insoluble in water, but soluble in ethanol.

It was first prepared in 1881 by the German chemist Rainer Ludwig Claisen (1851–1930) and the Swiss chemist Charles-Claude-Alexandre Claparède (14 April 1858 – 1 November 1913).

Preparation

The trans,trans isomer can be prepared in high yield and purity by condensation of benzaldehyde and acetone with sodium hydroxide in a water/ethanol medium followed by recrystallization.

This reaction, which proceeds via the intermediacy of benzylideneacetone, is often performed in organic chemistry classes, and is called Claisen-Schmidt condensation.

Reactions and derivatives
Prolonged exposure to sunlight initiates [2+2] cycloadditions, converting it to a mixture of dimeric and trimeric cyclobutane cycloadducts.

Uses
Dibenzylideneacetone is used as a component in sunscreens and as a ligand in organometallic chemistry.

For example, it is a component of the catalyst tris(dibenzylideneacetone)dipalladium(0). It is a labile ligand that is easily displaced by triphenylphosphine, hence it serves a useful entry point into palladium(0) chemistry.

References 

Enones
Sunscreening agents